The Bracken Ridge Ward is a Brisbane City Council ward covering Bracken Ridge, Bald Hills, Carseldine, Fitzgibbon, and parts of Aspley and Zillmere. The ward has been represented by Amanda Cooper of the Liberal National Party since 2007.
Amanda Cooper resigned in October 2019 to contest the District of Aspley in the 2020 QLD Election for the LNP.

History 
Liberal councillor Carol Cashman was elected in 1997, and re-elected in 2000 and 2004. Cashman resigned in 2007, and Amanda Cooper was appointed to the casual vacancy. Cooper has since been re-elected in 2008, 2012 and 2016.

Results

2020

2016

2012

External links
Bracken Ridge Ward Map at Electoral Commission of Queensland

References

City of Brisbane wards